Frank J. Bonner (August 20, 1869 – December 31, 1905) was an American professional baseball utility player. He played in Major League Baseball (MLB) from 1894 to 1903 for the Baltimore Orioles, St. Louis Browns, Brooklyn Bridegrooms, Washington Senators, Cleveland Bronchos, Philadelphia Athletics, and Boston Beaneaters. He was born in Lowell, Massachusetts. Bonner was nicknamed "the Human Flea".

Bonner died of blood poisoning at the age of 36. His wife had committed suicide in June of that year.

References

External links

1869 births
1905 deaths
Major League Baseball second basemen
Baseball players from Massachusetts
Baltimore Orioles (NL) players
St. Louis Browns (NL) players
Brooklyn Bridegrooms players
Washington Senators (1891–1899) players
Cleveland Bronchos players
Philadelphia Athletics players
Boston Beaneaters players
19th-century baseball players
Wilkes-Barre Coal Barons players
Scranton Red Sox players
Rochester Patriots players
Ottawa Wanderers players
Hartford Indians players
Rochester Bronchos players
Toronto Royals players
Louisville Colonels (minor league) players
Kansas City Blues (baseball) players
Deaths from sepsis